Schwarz und weiß wie Tage und Nächte  (Black and White Like Day and Night) is a West German film from 1978 directed by Wolfgang Petersen and starring Bruno Ganz.

Plot 
Thomas Rosemund, a scientist who swore off playing chess after a nervous breakdown as a young wunderkind, creates an undefeated chess program. However, the Russian world champ beats the program in a televised match. The West German mathematician becomes a top chess pro himself, which the West German media boast will prove the superiority of Germany and democracy. Rosemund believes that the entire Red Communist bloc is out to stop him from vanquishing their own Stefan Koruga, to become the next Bobby Fischer and a symbol that capitalism is preferable to socialism.

Critical reception
John Simon called Black and White Like Day and Night "the best film ever about chess".

References

External links 
 

1978 films
1978 television films
German drama films
West German films
German television films
1970s German-language films
German-language television shows
Films about chess
1970s psychological drama films
Films directed by Wolfgang Petersen
Films scored by Klaus Doldinger
1978 drama films
1970s German films
Das Erste original programming